Csaba Madarász (born 20 April 1968) is a Hungarian speed skater. He competed in three events at the 1992 Winter Olympics.

References

1968 births
Living people
Hungarian male speed skaters
Olympic speed skaters of Hungary
Speed skaters at the 1992 Winter Olympics
Sportspeople from Târgu Mureș